"Trillionaire" is a song by American rapper Future featuring fellow American rapper YoungBoy Never Broke Again. It was sent to rhythmic contemporary radio on May 26, 2020 as the fifth single from the former's eighth studio album High Off Life (2020).

Composition 
Future and NBA YoungBoy sing about their perseverance in rags to riches as well as the hardships they faced on the way.

Charts

References 

2020 singles
2020 songs
Future (rapper) songs
YoungBoy Never Broke Again songs
Epic Records singles
Songs written by Future (rapper)
Songs written by YoungBoy Never Broke Again